Type 13 may refer to:
Bugatti Type 13, the first real Bugatti car
Spinocerebellar ataxia type-13, a rare autosomal dominant disorder
Murata Type 13 rifle, a rifle of the Imperial Japanese Army - see Murata rifle
Mitsubishi Navy Type 13 Carrier Attack Bomber, a Japanese torpedo bomber
Bristol Type 13 MR.1, an experimental biplane produced by Bristol